Order of Loyalty and Valour (Traditional Chinese: 忠勇勳章) is a military award from the Republic of China. It was created on 23 September 1944 for outstanding command in battle.

It has one rank.

Reference list

Orders, decorations, and medals of the Republic of China
Awards established in 1944